Charles Michael "She" Donahue  (June 29, 1877 – August 27, 1947) played Major League baseball as an infielder for the St. Louis Cardinals and Philadelphia Phillies.

Sources

St. Louis Cardinals players
Philadelphia Phillies players
Major League Baseball shortstops
Major League Baseball third basemen
1877 births
1947 deaths
Baseball players from New York (state)
Oswego Grays players
Elmira Pioneers players
Spokane Blue Stockings players
Spokane Smoke Eaters players
Portland Green Gages players
Salt Lake City Elders players
Kansas City Blues (baseball) players
Wilkes-Barre Barons (baseball) players
Norfolk Tars players